Spirit was a Contemporary Christian music radio station on Sirius Satellite Radio channel 66 and DISH Network channel 6066.

As of 2004, Scott Lindy, director of country programming for Sirius, was overseeing operations for the station. On November 12, 2008, Spirit was eliminated from the Sirius lineup and has been replaced with XM's The Message as part of a restructuring by Sirius XM Radio.

Confusion with the XM Satellite Radio version
There was an XM version using the same name, but the XM station played Urban contemporary gospel music.  The two Spirits on Sirius and XM were taken away, and the XM version was replaced by Praise.

References

External links
 Sirius Spirit
 Dish Network Official Website

Defunct radio stations in the United States